Asoka Handagama (born December 1962) is a Sri Lankan filmmaker. He obtained his primary and secondary schooling in a provincial school and went on to study Mathematics at the University of Kelaniya where he was awarded a first class honours degree. He obtained his MSc in Development Economics at Warwick University in 1995. He is also an Assistant Governor of the Sri Lankan Central Bank.

Theatre 
Asoka Handagama's entry to filmmaking was via the theatre and television. His maiden theatrical effort, Bhoomika (film), was to address the seedling emerging ethnic crisis in the Island. The play won the National Youth award for best direction in 1985. His second stage play Thunder, was placed second runner up in the Best script in 1987 State drama Festival. The country was a real killing field when he directed his third, and most controversial play, Magatha. The play, with its radical theatrical form, bravely questioned the existing judicial system of the country. Magatha was shown almost all parts of the country, not only in the theatres, in the paddy fields and work places as well. Among all the controversies, the play won the Best Original Script and Best Director award in 1989, State Drama Festival. The script was published in 2011, and won the State Literary Award for Best Drama Script.

Television series
Asoka Handagama's exercises in the field of TV art were unique. Dunhidda Addara is a clear landmark in the history of so-called tele-dramas in Sri Lanka. It won all nine main awards including the Best Script and Direction, at the OCIC awards in 1994. Diyaketa Pahana, his third TV work, added a new dimension to the traditional tele-feature series. Synthetic Sihina explored a way to have a post-modern political discussion in the form of a serious episodic tele-play. He exploited the short spell of "ceasefire" (2003–2006) observed by Government forces and the Liberation Tigers of Tamil Ealam (LTTE) to shoot his next tele-feature series, Take This Road in Jaffna, the Northern capital of Sri Lanka to create a dialogue on the root causes of the ongoing war.  East is Calling, the tele-feature series was on the same theme set in a tsunami rehabilitation camp.

Films 
Chanda Kinnarie was his debut effort in cinema. Breaking the rules of so-called realism, this film clearly indicated the formation of a cinematic language consisting of hyper-realistic images. The film won the Award for Most Promising Director at the Critics' awards in 1994. It was also awarded Best Film, Best Director and Best Screenplay at the 1998 OCIC awards. Asoka Handagama's academic background in mathematics and development economics has stood him in good stead as an artist. Certainly it has helped him tackle the technical intricacies of film, television and the theatre, and to use these forms to maximum creative effect. More importantly this background has enabled him to sort out his priorities as a creative artiste who is conscious of the joys, sorrow and contradictions of daily life around him. Asoka Handagama is acutely aware of the social origins and implications of his work as a film and video maker.

These two acute concerns for the technical and the social in the movie making have not made it easy for him in his career. When he made his second film, Moon Hunt (1996), he used the experienced Japanese cinematographer Akira Takada because this film needed a specialist lighting camera technique, as the story of the whole film takes place at night. Handagama came in for a lot of criticism from his local colleagues for using a foreign cinematographer.  It won 6 main awards from Sri Lanka Film Critic's Forum awarded for Best Film, Best Director, Best Script, Best Actor, Best Actress and Best Cinematography in 2000. Unfortunately for some technical reasons the film did not come out to theatres in Sri Lanka.

His works started to attract independent film festival audience around the world with his movie Me Mage Sandai. Veteran Sri Lankan filmmaker Dr. Lester James Peiris named this work as the landmark film which launched the third revolution in Sri Lankan cinema.  It was a bold revelation of impact of the war in rural life in the country. Novel in the form, this minimalist film travelled all around the world, was critically acclaimed at more than 50 international film festivals, and won numerous awards in Singapore, Chonju, Delhi, Houston, Bangkok and Tokyo. The film also gained critical success in Europe, and has been considered one of "the most outstanding revelations of the decade" by the prestigious French Film Review "Les Cahiers du Cinéma".

‘Flying with One Wing  (2002)' was yet another courageous work by Asoka. This is the first time in this part of the world that the issue of gender politics is addressed in cinema. Having the World Premiere at the San Sebastian Film Festival (2002), it was adjudged as the Best Asian Film at the Tokyo International Film Festival (2002), Audience Award for Best Film at Torino International Film Festival and many more.

Aksharaya( Letter of Fire ) was considered the most controversial work and the most talked about film in his career.  Banned in Sri Lanka it raised a fundamental issue of freedom of cinematic expression in Sri Lanka's Supreme Court. Exposed only to international festivals like San Sebastian, Tokyo, this banned movie in Sri Lanka found its way to the YouTube where it has been seen by more than 3 million people there.

Disturbed by the painful experience he had with the Aksharaya struggle, he then went on to make a children's movie Vidhu ( 2010). 
Ini-Avan is considered the most accomplished cinematic work of Asoka Handagama. Premiered at Cannes 2012 as one of the films under ACID (l'Association du Cinéma Indépendant pour sa Diffusion-). Ini- Avan was one of the five films selected for in-depth discussions with the audience conducted by the University of Toronto at the Toronto International Film Festival. The film has been listed for many festivals including Edinburgh, Tokyo, Hamburg and many more.

Filmography

Awards and achievements

Theatre 

1. Magatha (1989)
 The Best Original Play, the Director and the Scriptwriter at the State Drama Festival 1989.

2. Hena (1987)
 First runner-up for The Best Original Script at the State Drama Festival 1987.

3. Bhumika  (1985)
 Best Original Play at the National Youth Awards 1985

4. A Death at an Antique Shop  (2021)

TV Features 
1. East is Calling (2006)

 Best Tele Series of the Year at the State Television Awards 2007
 Best Tele Series of the Year at the OCIC Awards 2007

2. Take This Road (2004)
 Best Director, Best Script Writer at the RAIGAM Tele Awards 2004

3. Synthetic Sihina (1998)
 Best Director, Best Script Writer at the OCIC Awards 2002

4. Diya Keta Pahana (Water Gauge) (1997)
 Best Director, Best Script, Best Production, Best Acting and Best Cinematography at the Sumathi Tele Awards 1998

5. Dunhinda Addara (Near Dunhinda) (1992)
 Won all nine major awards including the Best Director and the Best Script Writer at the OCIC awards 1994.

References

External links
 
 
 

Living people
Sri Lankan film directors
Kala Keerthi
1962 births